"Revolution" is a 1969 answer song by American jazz musician Nina Simone and Weldon Irvine. It was released as a single in 1969 and on the album To Love Somebody in 1969. The single release was split over two sides of a 45 rpm disc and these two edits were used as separate tracks on the album. The song was released the year after the Beatles' "Revolution", and is a variation of that song. "Revolution" didn't do as well as expected and Simone has expressed surprise and disappointment at its lack of success.

References

Songs about revolutions
Songs written by Nina Simone
Nina Simone songs
1968 singles
1968 songs
RCA Records singles